George Winthrop "Dixie" Fish (April 4, 1895 – February 22, 1977) was an American rugby union player who competed in the 1920 Summer Olympics. Fish was a graduate of Cal/Berkeley and Columbia Medical School and later became a noted urologist and supervised several professional organizations. Fish was a member of the American rugby union team, which won the gold medal at the Olympics games.

References

External links
profile

1895 births
1977 deaths
American rugby union players
Rugby union players at the 1920 Summer Olympics
Olympic gold medalists for the United States in rugby
United States international rugby union players
Medalists at the 1920 Summer Olympics